The Al-Khair Mosque is a mosque in Choa Chu Kang, Singapore.

History
Masjid Al-Khair was founded in the early 1960s. The original building was located on a hilltop surrounded by vegetable farms along Choa Chu Kang Road. It was realized through the joint effort of the Muslim community residing in that area and the former Minister of State, Dr Haji Yaacob Mohammad. Originally it was called the Jamek Mosque but subsequently renamed officially as Al-Khair in 1963.

In 1995, it was relocated and rebuilt into the majestic building that landmark the entrance to Teck Whye Crescent of today. The new building, completed in 1997, was the first mosque to be built in Phase 3 of the Mosque Building Fund programme and the 17th overall since the programme started in 1975.

It is noted for its senior citizens group called Sohibul Khair which organizes activities such as morning exercise and talks on living a healthy old age.

In 2017, Masjid Al Khair was renovated, with the addition of a new prayer hall on the third floor. Improvements were made to the roof, electrical system, and the facade. The upgraded mosque is now barrier free accessible with a lift access to all floors.

Transportation
The mosque is accessible from Choa Chu Kang MRT/LRT station.

See also
 Islam in Singapore
 List of mosques in Singapore

References

https://m.facebook.com/pg/MUIS.SG/photos/?tab=album&album_id=10154937215811329

External links 
Al-Khair Mosque
Muis
Portal for Mosques in Singapore
 GoogleMaps StreetView of Masjid Al-Khair

1997 establishments in Singapore
Choa Chu Kang
Mosques completed in 1997
Khair
20th-century architecture in Singapore